Yavnella is a genus of ants in the subfamily Leptanillinae. Its two species are distributed in India and Israel. The genus is known only from male specimens.

Species
 Yavnella argamani Kugler, 1987 – Israel
 Yavnella indica Kugler, 1987 – India

References

External links

Leptanillinae
Ant genera
Hymenoptera of Asia